Tithonia is a genus of flowering plants in the tribe Heliantheae within the family Asteraceae.

Tithonia has a center of distribution in Mexico but with one species extending into the Southwestern United States and several native to Central America.  Two species, T. diversifolia and T. rotundifolia, are widely cultivated and have escaped to become weeds in tropical and subtropical areas around the world. T. rotundifolia makes a nice fresh cut flower, flowering in mid- to late-summer in the Northern hemisphere. The distinguishing feature of the genus is the peduncle, which is fistulose (meaning hollow and flaring toward the apex).  The plants are coarse annual or perennial herbs or shrubs, and one species, T. koelzii, is a small tree.

 Species
 Tithonia brachypappa B.L.Rob. - San Luis Potosí
 Tithonia calva Sch.Bip. - Durango, Sinaloa
 Tithonia diversifolia (Hemsl.) A.Gray – tree marigold - Mexico, Central America; naturalized in Asia, Australia, Africa, South America, Florida, Texas, various oceanic islands
 Tithonia fruticosa Canby & Rose - Chihuahua, Durango, Sonora, Sinaloa
 Tithonia helianthoides Bernh.
 Tithonia hondurensis La Duke - Belize, Honduras
 Tithonia koelzii McVaugh - Jalisco
 Tithonia longiradiata (Bertol.) S.F.Blake - Mexico, Central America
 Tithonia pedunculata Cronquist - Oaxaca
 Tithonia pittieri (Greenm.) S.F.Blake - Central America
 Tithonia rotundifolia  (Mill.) S.F.Blake  - Mexico, Central America; naturalized in Florida, Louisiana, South America
 Tithonia tagetiflora Desf. - Veracruz
 Tithonia thurberi Gray – Arizona sunflower weed - Chihuahua, Sonora, Arizona (Pima County)
 Tithonia tubaeformis (Jacq.) Cass. - Mexico, Central America; naturalized in Argentina
 formerly included
see Comaclinium Enceliopsis Lasianthaea Viguiera

References

 La Duke, J. C. 1982. Revision of Tithonia. Rhodora 84: 453–522.

External links

Heliantheae
Asteraceae genera